Frankie Narvaez (December 3, 1939 – April 15, 2004) from Caguas, Puerto Rico was a Puerto Rican boxer. He beat world champions Carlos Cruz, Chango Carmona and Pedro Adigue, and lost to Ismael Laguna, among others.

He died in Hartford, Connecticut at the age of 64.

1939 births
2004 deaths
People from Caguas, Puerto Rico
Puerto Rican male boxers